The 1999-2000 Gonzaga men's basketball team represented Gonzaga University as a member of the West Coast Conference during the 1999-2000 NCAA Division I men's basketball season. They were led by first-year coach Mark Few and reached the Sweet Sixteen of the NCAA tournament.

Roster

Schedule

|-
!colspan=9 style="background:#002967; color:white;"| Regular season

|-
!colspan=9 style="background:#002967; color:white;"| WCC Tournament

|-
!colspan=9 style="background:#002967; color:white;"| NCAA tournament

Rankings

References

Gonzaga Bulldogs men's basketball seasons
Gonzaga
Gonzaga
1999 in sports in Washington (state)
2000 in sports in Washington (state)